Counter Information was a revolutionary left-wing news sheet produced by groups in Edinburgh, Glasgow, and Leeds from the 1980s to 2004.

The news sheet covered grassroots struggles in Scotland, the United Kingdom, and worldwide. Counter Information adopted a class struggle anarchist perspective, and invited readers to participate in the magazine's writing and editing.

References

Further reading 

 

1980s establishments in the United Kingdom
2004 disestablishments in the United Kingdom
Anarchist periodicals published in the United Kingdom
Political magazines published in the United Kingdom
Far-left politics in the United Kingdom
Far-left politics in Scotland
Politics of Edinburgh
Politics of Glasgow
Politics of Leeds
Magazines established in the 1980s
Magazines disestablished in 2004